The ARM Cortex-A53 is one of the first two central processing units implementing the ARMv8-A 64-bit instruction set designed by ARM Holdings' Cambridge design centre. The Cortex-A53 is a 2-wide decode  superscalar processor, capable of dual-issuing some instructions.  It was announced October 30, 2012 and is marketed by ARM as either a stand-alone, more energy-efficient alternative to the more powerful Cortex-A57 microarchitecture, or to be used alongside a more powerful microarchitecture in a big.LITTLE configuration. It is available as an IP core to licensees, like other ARM intellectual property and processor designs.

Overview
 8-stage pipelined processor with 2-way superscalar, in-order execution pipeline
 DSP and NEON SIMD extensions are mandatory per core
 VFPv4 Floating Point Unit onboard (per core)
 Hardware virtualization support
 TrustZone security extensions
 64-byte cache lines
 10-entry L1 TLB, and 512-entry L2 TLB
 4KiB conditional branch predictor, 256-entry indirect branch predictor

Utilization 
The Cortex-A53 is the most widely used architecture for mobile SoCs since 2014 to the present day, making it one of the longest-running ARM processors for mobile devices. It is currently featured in most entry-level and lower mid-range SoCs, while higher-end SoCs used the newer ARM Cortex-A55. The latest SoCs still using the Cortex-A53 are MediaTek Helio G36, both of which are entry-level SoCs designed for budget smartphones.

The ARM Cortex-A53 processor has been used in the LeMaker HiKey since 2015, the Raspberry Pi 3 since February 2016, and the Raspberry Pi Zero 2 W since October 2021.

The Cortex-A53 is also used in a number of Qualcomm, Samsung, and MediaTek SoCs. Semi-custom derivatives of the Cortex-A53 have been used in Qualcomm's Kryo 250 and Kryo 260 CPUs.

The processor is used in the ODROID-C2 and in Roku streaming media players (in the high-end models from 2016 and in all models released between 2017 and 2019). Another notable Cortex-A53 application is the Pine A64/A64+ single-board computer.

These cores are used in a 24-core SoC, the Socionext SynQuacer SC2A11.

The processor is used in Amazon Fire tablets, including the Fire HD 8 and the Fire HD 10 (the latter also includes Cortex-A72 cores) as well as the Nintendo Switch. It is also used in some Amazon Echo Show models such as the Echo Show 5, Echo Show 8, and Echo Show 5 (2nd Gen).

The processor is used in Fortinet's Fortigate 81F entry-level firewalls.

See also
 Comparison of ARMv8-A cores

References

External links
 

ARM processors